The Ligurian Alps are a mountain range in northwestern Italy. A small part is located in France. They form the south-western extremity of the Alps, separated from the Apennines by the Colle di Cadibona. The Col de Tende and the Vermenagna valley separate them from the Maritime Alps. They form the border between Piedmont in the north and Liguria in the south.

Geography 
Administratively the range is divided between the Italian provinces of Cuneo, Imperia and Savona and the French department of Alpes-Maritimes (south-western slopes).

The Ligurian Alps are drained by the Tanaro River, along with other tributaries of the Po River, on the Piedmontese side, and by several smaller rivers that flow directly to the Mediterranean Sea on the Ligurian and French side.

Chief peaks and passes 

The chief peak of the Western Ligurian Alps is Punta Marguareis (2,651 m), and there are several other summits over 2000 m, while in Eastern Ligurian Alps (also called Ligurian Prealps) the maximum elevation is 1739 m (Monte Armetta).

Some important passes in the Ligurian Alps are listed below.

Conservation 

Around  of the Ligurian side of the range since 2007 are part of the Parco naturale regionale delle Alpi Liguri. On the northern side of the range stands the Natural Park of Marguareis, another regional natural park  established by the  regional government of Piemonte in 1978.

See also
 Apennines
 List of highest paved roads in Europe
 List of mountain passes

Maps
 Italian official cartography (Istituto Geografico Militare - IGM); on-line version: www.pcn.minambiente.it
 French official cartography (Institut Géographique National - IGN); on-line version: www.geoportail.fr

References 

 
Mountain ranges of the Alps
Mountain ranges of Liguria
Mountain ranges of Piedmont